Secrets of an Actress is a 1938 romantic drama film directed by William Keighley, and starring Kay Francis, George Brent, and Ian Hunter. It is about a love triangle between a stage actress, her financial backer, and his friend.

Plot summary

Architects Dick Orr and Peter Snowden fall in love with actress Fay Carter and get involved in her show business aspirations.

Cast
 Kay Francis as Fay Carter
 George Brent as Dick Orr
 Ian Hunter as Peter Snowden
 Gloria Dickson as Carla Orr
 Isabel Jeans as Marian Plantagenet
 Penny Singleton as Miss Reid
 Dennie Moore as Miss Blackstone
 Selmer Jackson as Mr. Thompson
 Herbert Rawlinson as Mr. Harrison
 Emmett Vogan as Joe Spencer (as Emmet Vogan)
 James B. Carson as Carstairs
 George O'Hanlon as Flowers Delivery Boy (uncredited)

References

External links
 
 
 
 

1938 films
American black-and-white films
Films directed by William Keighley
Films scored by Heinz Roemheld
1938 romantic drama films
Warner Bros. films
American romantic drama films
1930s English-language films
1930s American films